Kongsfjorden Bird Sanctuary is a 140 ha bird reserve at Svalbard, Norway, established in 1973. It includes islands and islets in Kongsfjorden, Haakon VII Land. It lies at the inner end of the fjord and consists of about ten islands, mainly covered with grassy vegetation and having small freshwater ponds. The fjord is surrounded by steep mountains, cliffs, glaciers and tundra. The reserve has been recognised as a wetland of international importance by designation under the Ramsar Convention. It has also been identified as an Important Bird Area (IBA) by BirdLife International. It supports breeding populations of pink-footed and barnacle geese, common and king eiders, long-tailed ducks, purple sandpipers, red phalaropes, glaucous gulls, long-tailed jaegers and snow buntings. Ivory gulls have been recorded.

References

Bird sanctuaries in Svalbard
Protected areas established in 1973
1973 establishments in Norway
Ny-Ålesund
Ramsar sites in Norway
Important Bird Areas of Svalbard